Jimmy Akin (born in 1965, Corpus Christi, Texas) is an American Catholic convert, apologist with Catholic Answers, and podcast host.

Biography
Born in 1965 in Corpus Christi, Texas, Jimmy Akin grew up in Fayetteville, Arkansas. As a child, he attended services at the local Church of Christ with his parents but became interested in the New Age movement as a teenager. During his time in college, Akin encountered the preaching of the televangelist Eugene "Gene" Scott and became a Christian, finding a denominational home in the conservative Presbyterian Church in America, and wanted to be a pastor or seminary professor.

Soon after becoming a Christian, Akin met his future wife, Renee Humphrey, who had been baptized a Catholic but held many New Age beliefs. Over the course of their relationship, Renee reverted to Catholicism and resumed practicing the faith. They were married in 1991 and Akin soon after converted to Catholicism in 1992. Later that year, Humphrey died of colon cancer.

He is a senior apologist for Catholic Answers. Akin defended charges that Pope John Paul II engaged in self-flagellation, writing, "Self-mortification teaches humility by making us recognize that there are things more important than our own pleasure." Akin said that while Chick tracts were inaccurate, he thought they brought some people to God.

Since 2018, Akin has been the co-host (alongside Dom Bettinelli) of "Jimmy Akin's Mysterious World", a podcast examining mysteries and the paranormal from a Catholic perspective.

Akin debated New Testament critic Bart D. Ehrman on the historical reliability of the Gospels in March 2022.

Works
 "A Triumph and a Tragedy" in Surprised By Truth: 11 Converts Give the Biblical and Historical Reasons for Becoming Catholic (Basilica Press, 1994)
 The Salvation Controversy (Catholic Answers Press, 2001)
 The Nightmare World of Jack Chick (Catholic Answers Press, 2008)
 The Fathers Know Best: Your Essential Guide to Early Christian Teaching (Catholic Answers Press, 2010)
 "Anti-Catholicism" in Disorientation: How to Go to College Without Losing Your Mind (Ascension Press, 2010)
 Mass Revision: How the Liturgy Is Changing and What It Means for You (Ignatius Press, 2011)
 Mass Appeal: The ABCs of Worship (Catholic Answers Press, 2012)
 The Drama of Salvation: How God Rescues You from Your Sins and Delivers You to Eternal Life (Catholic Answers Press, 2015)
 A Daily Defense: 365 Days (plus one) to Becoming a Better Apologist (Catholic Answers Press, 2016)
 Teaching with Authority: How to Cut Through Doctrinal Confusion & Understand What the Church Really Says (Catholic Answers Press, 2018)
 The Bible Is A Catholic Book (Catholic Answers Press, 2019)

References

External links

American Roman Catholic religious writers
Converts to Roman Catholicism from Presbyterianism
1965 births
Living people
People from Corpus Christi, Texas
American podcasters
Catholic Church in popular culture